Syringetin is an O-methylated flavonol, a type of flavonoid. It is found in red grape (absent in white grape), in Lysimachia congestiflora and in Vaccinium uliginosum (bog billberries). It is one of the phenolic compounds present in wine.

It induces human osteoblast differentiation through bone morphogenetic protein-2/extracellular signal-regulated kinase 1/2 pathway.

Metabolism
Syringetin is formed from laricitrin by the action of the enzyme laricitrin 5′-O-methyltransferase (myricetin O-methyltransferase).

Glycosides
 Syringetin-3-O-galactoside
 Syringetin-3-O-glucoside
 Syringetin 3-rhamnoside (CAS number 93126-00-2)
 Syringetin-3-O-rutinoside found in Larix sibirica
 [[Syringetin 3-O-(6-acetyl)-β-glucopyranoside|Syringetin 3-O-(6′′-acetyl)-β-glucopyranoside]] found in Picea abies'' (Norway spruce)

References 

O-methylated flavonols
Resorcinols